Enfant Terrible is a 2020 German drama film directed by Oskar Roehler about the German film director Rainer Werner Fassbinder. It was selected to be shown at the 2020 Cannes Film Festival.

Cast
 Oliver Masucci as Rainer Werner Fassbinder
 Hary Prinz as Kurt Raab
 Katja Riemann as Gudrun
 Jochen Schropp as Armin Meier
 Erdal Yıldız as El Hedi ben Salem
 Markus Hering as Peer Raben
 Frida-Lovisa Hamann as Martha
 André Hennicke as Volker Spengler
 Christian Berkel as Interviewer
 Eva Mattes as Brigitte Mira
 Alexander Scheer as Andy Warhol
 Désirée Nick as Barbara Valentin
 Götz Otto as Jack Palance
 Detlef Bothe as Wally Brockmeyer
 Sunnyi Melles as Rosel Zech
 Michael Klammer as Günther Kaufmann
 Anton Rattinger as Britta
 Lucas Gregorowicz as Ulli Lommel
 Felix Hellmann as Harry Baer
 Simon Böer as Michael Ballhaus

References

External links
 
 

2020 films
2020 drama films
2020 biographical drama films
German biographical drama films
2020s German-language films
Films directed by Oskar Roehler
Films scored by Martin Todsharow
Films about filmmaking
Biographical films about film directors and producers
2020s German films
Rainer Werner Fassbinder